Aastra Technologies Limited, formerly headquartered in Concord, Ontario, Canada, made products and systems for accessing communication networks, including the Internet. Its products included residential and business telephone terminals, screen telephones, Enterprise private branch exchanges (PBX), network access terminals and high-quality digital video encoders, decoders and gateways. Residential telephone equipment was sold in the United States as Bell equipment by Sonecor brand, which represented Southern New England Telecommunications.

Mitel Networks Corporation announced on November 11, 2013, that it would acquire Aastra Technologies Ltd. in a stock and cash deal valued at about $400 million.

History 
In 1983, Francis Shen and Hugh Scholaert bought an engineering consulting company, founding Aastra in Toronto in 1983. The company provided services to the defense industry. In 1993, the company started to specialise in telecommunications. Aastra went public in Canada in 1996.

In 2000, Aastra acquired the assets of Nortel Networks Access Solutions Division including the rights to manufacture phones under the Nortel name. Then, in 2001, Aastra acquired Lucent Technologies' Digital Video business and Ericsson Cable Modem. Aastra acquired Nortel CVX & CSG Division in 2002 and the ASCOM PBX System Division in 2003.

In 2005, 75% of Aastra Technologies' sales were made in Europe, following the purchase that year of the Germany-based the EADS Enterprise Telephony Business and the DeTeWe Telecommunication Systems business. Its other sales shares that year included 17% in the United States, and only 5% in Canada.

In 2008, Aastra acquired the enterprise PBX division of Ericsson, best known for MD110/MX-ONE Telephony Switch.

In January 2014, Mitel completed its acquisition of Aastra, which has been announced in November 2013. Mitel lists the fate of former Aastra products on its website.

Awards
In 2008, Aastra received Internet Telephony's Best of Show Award for 2007 for Best Large Enterprise Solution.

See also 
 List of VOIP companies

References

External links 
 Aastra Corporate

Companies formerly listed on the Toronto Stock Exchange
Canadian companies established in 1983
Telecommunications companies established in 1983
1983 establishments in Ontario
Telecommunications companies of Canada
Electronics companies of Canada
Companies based in Vaughan
VoIP companies of Canada
Teleconferencing
1996 initial public offerings
2014 mergers and acquisitions
Telecommunications companies disestablished in 2014
2014 disestablishments in Ontario